Oru New Generation Pani is a Malayalam movie written and directed by Shankar Narayanan. It features Biyon, Anil Kumar MS, Devan and Thalaivasal Vijay in lead roles.

Cast
 Biyon
 Deepthi
 Devan
 Anil Murali
 Thalaivasal Vijay
 Saju Kodiyan
 Anil Kumar MS
 Narayanankutty
 Jaffer Idukki
 Manju Raghavan

References

2010s Malayalam-language films